Jiandu is an atonal pinyin romanization of various Chinese names and words.

It may refer to:

 Jiandu (建都), a former name of Xichang in Sichuan
 Jiandu (简牍), bamboo and wooden slips used for writing in East Asia